Art Theatre Guild (ATG) was a film production company in Japan that started in 1961 and ran through to the mid-1980s, releasing mostly Japanese New Wave and arthouse films.

History
ATG began as an independent agency which distributed foreign films in Japan. With the decline of the major Japanese film studios in the 1960s, an "art house" cinema group formed around ATG and the company moved into distributing Japanese works rejected by the major studios. By 1967 ATG was assisting with production costs for a number of new Japanese films. Some of the early films released by ATG include Shōhei Imamura's A Man Vanishes (1967), Nagisa Oshima's Diary Of A Shinjuku Thief (1968) and Death by Hanging (1968), Toshio Matsumoto's masterpiece Funeral Parade of Roses (1969), and Akio Jissoji's Mujo (1970).

See also
 Art Theatre Guild filmography

References

Sources
 
 
  (orig. English article from Minikoni (N°70))

Further reading 

 

Japanese film studios
Mass media companies established in 1981